Bedford Park Boulevard may refer to:

 A thoroughfare in the Bedford Park, Bronx and Jerome Park neighborhoods of The Bronx
 Stations of the New York City Subway in the Bronx:
Bedford Park Boulevard – Lehman College (IRT Jerome Avenue Line), serving the  train
Bedford Park Boulevard (IND Concourse Line), serving the  trains; also the north terminal of the  train during rush hours
200th Street – Bedford Park Boulevard (IRT Third Avenue Line), the now demolished station of the Third Ave elevated

See also
Bedford Park (disambiguation)